Detective Belli is a 1969 Italian poliziotteschi directed by Romolo Guerrieri and starring Franco Nero. It is based on the novel Macchie di belletto by Ludovico Dentice.

Plot 
The rude Commissioner Belli (Franco Nero) is entrusted with the investigation into the death of a record producer, this Mr. Romanis (Marino Masé). The man, shot dead in his apartment, not far from the centre of Rome, is found a few hours after his death. The gunshots shattered the window of the apartment, but no one seems to have noticed anything. In a whirlwind of events, the commissioner comes into contact with a series of characters: from the model Sandy (Delia Boccardo) to the pop singer Emanuelle (Susanna Martinková), from the lawyer Fontana (Adolfo Celi) to his beautiful wife, Mrs. Vera ( Florinda Bolkan). These characters revolve around the story, revealing uncomfortable details of Roma well. After the death of Mino (Maurizio Bonuglia) (son of the lawyer Fontana) and Sandy, Commissioner Belli will find himself faced with the truth, unmasking the unsuspected murderess.

Cast
 Franco Nero as Detective Stefano Belli
 Florinda Bolkan as Vera Fontana
 Adolfo Celi as Lawyer Fontana
 Delia Boccardo as Sandy Bronson
 Susanna Martinková as Emmanuelle
 Renzo Palmer as Commissioner Balsamo
 Roberto Bisacco as Claude
 Maurizio Bonuglia as Mino Fontana
 Laura Antonelli as Franca
 Geoffrey Copleston as Police Chief
 Silvia Dionisio as Gabriella
 Marino Masé as Romanis

Background and style
Film critic and historian Roberto Curti identifies Detective Belli and Days of Fire as examples of Italian crime films influenced by the themes of film noir. In a similar manner to his earlier giallo film The Sweet Body of Deborah, Guerrieri's film also employs tropes of the "sexy thriller" subgenre.

Release
Detective Belli was released in Italy by Interfilm on September 6, 1969, where it grossed 616.63 million Italian lira. At the height of the popularity of the 1970s poliziotteschi cycle, the film was re-released under the title Tracce di rossetto e di droga per un detective ("Traces of lipstick and drugs for a detective"). Nero would later play another character with the surname Belli in 1973's High Crime; the character in that film differs from the corrupt protagonist of Guerrieri's film.

Reception
Critic Giovanni Buttafava praised the film's ending, describing it as "nocturnal, stylized, à la Jean-Pierre Melville, with the cold yet emotionally charged confrontation between the half-rotten-half-clean cop Franco Nero and Florinda Bolkan, with stylistic traits of film noir mythologizing which were rare in Italy, and rather remarkable as well". Curti praised Guerrieri's work on the film, stating that it "amply shows that he's an accomplished director in his own right".

References

Footnotes

Sources

External links

1969 films
1969 crime films
1960s Italian-language films
Italian detective films
Films directed by Romolo Guerrieri
Films set in Rome
Films scored by Fred Bongusto
Poliziotteschi films
Police detective films
1960s Italian films